Emily Bond (born 13 October 1973) is a British former professional tennis player.

Biography
A right-handed player from Gloucestershire, Bond played on the professional tour in the 1990s.

Bond won her first ITF singles title at Swindon in 1993, beating Russian Fed Cup representative Svetlana Parkhomenko in the final. In 1994 she qualified for the main draw of a WTA Tour tournament in Moscow, where she was beaten in three sets by Ruxandra Dragomir in the opening round. She had a win over future top 50 player Sonya Jeyaseelan in the 1996 Wimbledon qualifiers and the following year reached her best singles ranking of 297 in the world.

As a doubles player, Bond twice featured in the main draw at Wimbledon. She qualified for the women's doubles as a lucky loser partnering Claire Taylor in 1993, then received a wildcard to compete with Joanne Moore in 1995.

ITF Circuit finals

Singles (2–1)

Doubles (1–6)

References

External links
 
 

1973 births
Living people
British female tennis players
Tennis people from Gloucestershire
English female tennis players